The Central Office of Information (COI) was the UK government's marketing and communications agency. Its Chief Executive reported to the Minister for the Cabinet Office. It was a non-ministerial department, and became an executive agency and a trading fund, recovering its costs from the other departments, executive agencies and publicly funded bodies which used its services.

It was established in 1946 as the successor to the wartime Ministry of Information, when individual government departments resumed responsibility for information policy. It worked with Whitehall departments and public bodies to produce information campaigns on issues that affected the lives of British citizens, from health and education to benefits, rights and welfare.

COI celebrated its 60th anniversary in 2006 with several events including a film season at the National Film Theatre and a poll to find Britain's favourite public information film on the BBC website.

From 2010, governmental spending on marketing fell considerably. This was because of the Coalition Government's policy to support only essential campaigns. As a result, the government announced that COI would be closed and its remaining functions transferred to the Cabinet Office.

The Central Office of Information closed on 30 December 2011.

References

External links
 (Archived) 

1946 establishments in the United Kingdom
Defunct executive agencies of the United Kingdom government
Defunct departments of the Government of the United Kingdom
Cabinet Office (United Kingdom)
Public service announcement organizations
Propaganda in the United Kingdom
2012 disestablishments in the United Kingdom